Roz Turnbull (born 1972) is a New Zealand actress who has appeared in a number of films and television series in New Zealand, but is best known for her role as Rochelle in Outrageous Fortune. She has been seen in Mercy Peak, Shortland Street, the first season of The Almighty Johnsons and Go Girls.

Career summary

In 2010, after doing her role for the sixth series of Outrageous Fortune, Roz was offered a leading role in South Pacific Pictures’ TV drama/comedy series, The Almighty Johnsons, a co-production from the makers of the Outrageous Fortune, Rachel Lang and James Griffin for TV3. This was followed by two South Pacific Pictures' 90 minute drama tel-films called, Stolen and Spies and Lies aired on TV ONE. Her other TV films include, Jackson's Wharf in 2000, The Vector File in 2001, two series of Mercy Peak (2001 – 2003) and a meaty role in the South Pacific Pictures feature film We're Here to Help in 2007. 
 
Roz's talents surprised her admirers as she also proved herself to be an accomplished singer with performances at TV3’s Big Night In Telethon (2009) and Christmas in the Park (2009), besides doing private gigs. The other side of her talent included acting in theatrical dramas like, Girl Talk, Rigoletto, Magic Flute, Grand Hotel, Follies, Trust, Popcorn, to name a few.

Personal

Stardom does not seem to affect Roz when it comes to her idea about family life. She has always time to enjoy the warmth of her country home just outside Auckland and spend time with her two little boys, and husband Lance, who works as manager in a childrenswear company. she believes in making sacrifices in order to achieve a stable family life. ”When you get married and have kids, it stops being about you all the time. You can’t just carry on purely making choices that suit you", is what Roz has to say. 
 
She further speaks her mind about the philosophy of life like this: "Lance is fully supportive of my work but he still deserves to have a wife. I can’t just say, 'Sorry, darling, I’m off to this party,’ or 'I'm going to do a play in Wellington for three months.' That's not what a relationship is all about. Lance provides a lifestyle that allows me to do the job I do. I don't take that for granted".

Filmography

External links
 
 Roz Turnbull at Auckland Actors.co.nz

References

Living people
1972 births
New Zealand actresses
New Zealand film actresses
New Zealand television actresses
New Zealand soap opera actresses
21st-century New Zealand actresses